Jung Seung-hyun (Hanja: 鄭昇炫, born 3 April 1994) is a South Korean footballer who plays as defender for Ulsan Hyundai. He won two AFC Champions Leagues with Kashima Antlers and Ulsan Hyundai.

Career
Jung joined Ulsan Hyundai before 2015 K League 1 starts. He made his debut in the league match against Incheon United on 19 April. In mid-2017, he left Ulsan to join Sagan Tosu. After just one season, Sagan swapped him for Mu Kanazaki to Kashima Antlers.

International career
In May 2018 he was named in South Korea's preliminary 28 man squad for the 2018 FIFA World Cup in Russia.

Club statistics
Updated to 5 March 2023.

Honours

International
South Korea
 EAFF East Asian Cup: 2017

Club
Kashima Antlers
AFC Champions League: 2018

Ulsan Hyundai
AFC Champions League: 2020
K League 1: 2022

References

External links
 Jung Seung-hyun – National Team Stats at KFA 

1994 births
Living people
Association football defenders
South Korean footballers
Ulsan Hyundai FC players
Sagan Tosu players
Kashima Antlers players
K League 1 players
J1 League players
Yonsei University alumni
Footballers at the 2016 Summer Olympics
Olympic footballers of South Korea
2018 FIFA World Cup players
South Korea under-23 international footballers
South Korea international footballers
South Korean expatriate footballers
Expatriate footballers in Japan
South Korean expatriate sportspeople in Japan
Sportspeople from Incheon
2019 AFC Asian Cup players